Richard Lewis Tweedie (22 August 1947 – 7 June 2001) was an Australian statistician.

Education
After having completed his undergraduate studies and a Master of Arts at the Australian National University, Tweedie moved to Cambridge University, where he obtained his doctorate under the supervision of David George Kendall in 1972. Additionally, in 1986 he was awarded a Doctor of Science degree from the ANU for his major contributions to the theory of Markov chains on a measurable state space.

Career
Tweedie joined the company Siromath in 1981 as general manager, and became its managing director in 1983. He taught at Bond University as Foundation Dean and Foundation Professor of Information Sciences from 1987 to 1992, after which he joined the faculty of Colorado State University (CSU). He was chair of CSU's Department of Statistics from 1992 to 1997, and left CSU to join the faculty of the University of Minnesota in 1999. When he died in 2001 of a heart attack, he was the chair of the University of Minnesota's Division of Biostatistics.

Tobacco industry consulting
Tweedie did some work as a tobacco industry consultant during his career. This work included presenting his analysis of studies on the health effects of passive smoking at a 1980 meeting, to which he had been invited by the industry.

Recognition
Tweedie was elected as a Fellow of the American Statistical Association in 1997.

References

Further reading

2001 deaths
1947 births
Australian statisticians
Academic staff of Bond University
Colorado State University faculty
University of Minnesota faculty
Australian National University alumni
Alumni of the University of Cambridge
People from New South Wales
Fellows of the American Statistical Association
Mathematical statisticians
Probability theorists